Pordeh Sar (also known as Pordsar) is a village in Baladeh Rural District, Khorramabad District, Tonekabon County, Mazandaran Province, Iran. At the 2006 census, its population was 97, in 30 families.

References 

Populated places in Tonekabon County